Kiptopeke is an unincorporated community in Northampton County, Virginia, United States.

Cape Charles Light was listed on the National Register of Historic Places in 2003.

See also
Kiptopeke State Park

References

GNIS reference

Unincorporated communities in Virginia
Unincorporated communities in Northampton County, Virginia